Aksel (Axel) Bakunts (Alexander Stepani Tevosyan; , 1899 – July 8, 1937) was an Armenian prose writer, film-writer, translator and public activist.

Life and career
Bakunts was born 1899 in Goris in Armenia and educated at the Gevorkian Seminary in Echmiadzin. Always outspoken, his first publication, a satirical account of the mayor of Goris, earned him a stint in jail in 1915. He subsequently served as an Armenian volunteer in the battles of Erzurum, Kars and Sardarabad. Between 1918 and 1919 he was a teacher, proof-reader and reporter in Yerevan. In 1920 he was accepted to the Kharkov Institute in Ukraine to study agriculture. After graduation in 1923, he worked as an agronomist in Zangezur, a region of Armenia that features prominently in his short stories.

From 1926 he settled in Yerevan where he quickly established his reputation as a gifted writer with his first collection of short stories entitled Mtnadzor [The Dark Valley]. His oeuvre includes short story collections, various individual pieces in the press, fragments of novels destroyed following his arrest in 1936, and three screenplays for films produced by Hyefilm in the 1930s.

A colleague and friend of Yeghishe Charents, Bakunts was a member of the former's Armenian Association of Proletarian Writers. Bakunts fell victim to the Stalinist terror and was accused of various crimes including alienation from socialist society. He was arrested in 1936 and is believed to have been shot after a twenty-five-minute trial in 1937.

Museum 

The house in Goris, Armenia, where Bakunts grew up is a museum dedicated to his life and work, operating as a branch of the Yeghishe Charents Museum of Literature and Arts.  Bakunts lived there as a child, and also at other times in his life.  The museum includes four small rooms that display Bakunts' furniture, correspondence, and books, as well as household items, valuable pictures, documents, stories and novels that were published in periodicals.

Works
His most famous works are "Alpiakan manushak" (dedicated to Arpenik Charents, the first wife of Yeghishe Charents), "Lar-Markar", "Namak rusats tagavorin" ("A Letter to the Russian Tsar"), "Kyores" (1935) etc. Bakunts also was a film-writer ("Zangezur", etc.).  A 1927 collection of his short stories, "Mtnadzor," was translated into English by Nairi Hakhverdi as "The Dark Valley" and published by the Gomidas Institute in 2009.

References

External links

Works by Bakunts in Armenian
The Dark Valley
Short Films based on a Aksel Bakunts short story Pheasant/Միրհավ

1937 deaths
1899 births
People from Goris
Armenian activists
20th-century Armenian writers
Great Purge victims from Armenia
Soviet rehabilitations
20th-century translators
Armenian male writers